War of Will is the second studio album by American extreme metal band Battlecross.  Produced at Audiohammer Studios in Sanford, FL, the work was released on July 9, 2013 via Metal Blade Records peaking at No. 2 on Heatseekers Albums during its first month while debuting at No. 134 on Billboard 200.

Production 
Percussion for the album was performed by Shannon Lucas, formerly of The Black Dahlia Murder, after drummer Michael Kreger and the band parted ways.  Additionally, Jason Suecof performed a string solo for the work.

Track listing

Personnel 
Kyle Gunther – vocals
Tony Asta – lead guitar
Hiran Deraniyagala – rhythm guitar
Don Slater – bass
Shannon Lucas - drums

Chart performance

References 

2013 albums
Battlecross albums
Metal Blade Records albums
Albums produced by Mark Lewis (music producer)